The Catholic–Orthodox clash in Aleppo occurred in 1818, when Aleppo was part of the Ottoman Empire, between Catholic and Orthodox Christians. In the midst of the violence, the walis troops killed nine Catholic Melkites, one Syriac Catholic, and one Maronite. According to Hidemitsu Kuroki, the clash was "a symbolic moment in the last phase" of "the process of the separation and establishment of the millet of Catholic Melchites", which "is considered to have been the catalyst for the emergence of the modern millet system in the Ottoman Empire."

References

Sources 
 
 

1818 in the Ottoman Empire
History of Aleppo
Eastern Orthodox–Catholic conflicts